Shōkadō Shōjō (松花堂昭乗, 1584-1639) was an Edo period Buddhist monk, painter, calligrapher and master of the tea ceremony.

Shōjō is the Buddhist name the youth was given when he entered the Hachiman shrine on Otoko-yama (Yawata) near Kyoto. He later served the Konoe family under Konoe Nobutada. At that time he also became acquainted with the Zen-monks of Daitoku-ji. In 1627 he became the head of the small Takimoto-bō temple nearby; ten years later, he retired to a hut on the temple's estate which he called . This became the name under which he is currently best known.

References

External links
The Shokado Tea House, Yawata
Momoyama, Japanese Art in the Age of Grandeur, an exhibition catalog from The Metropolitan Museum of Art (fully available online as PDF), which contains material on Shōkadō Shōjō

1584 births
1639 deaths
17th-century Japanese calligraphers
Edo period Buddhist clergy